|}

The Liffey Handicap Hurdle is a National Hunt hurdle race in Ireland which is open to horses aged four years or older. It is run at Leopardstown over a distance of about 2 miles (3,219 metres), and during its running there are eight hurdles to be jumped. It is a handicap race, and it is scheduled to take place each year in late January or early February .

The present race has evolved from the Irish Sweeps Hurdle, an event which was first run in 1969. This was one of several races which contributed to the Irish Hospitals' Sweepstake, a scheme to help fund investment in Ireland's health service. Thousands of tickets were sold to the public, and each was allocated with the name of a horse due to run in a particular race. The tickets corresponding to the winning horse could yield a substantial dividend. The Irish Sweeps Hurdle initially took place at Fairyhouse, and it was then transferred to Leopardstown in 1971. In its early years the race took place in December, and prior to becoming a handicap it served as a major trial for the Champion Hurdle when it was won by champions such as Persian War, Comedy of Errors and Night Nurse, as well as the future Cheltenham Gold Cup winner, Captain Christy.

A second phase of the race's history began in 1987, when it became known as the Ladbroke Hurdle. This event was run at Leopardstown each year in January until 2000, but it was then switched to a different venue, Ascot in Great Britain. Since 2001 this has been the usual venue of the race, now named the Betfair Exchange Trophy Handicap Hurdle, and the race is now scheduled to be run in December.

The Pierse Hurdle, named after its sponsor Pierse Contracting Ltd, was introduced at Leopardstown in January 2001. It had an identical format to that of the "Ladbroke", and it was in effect a continuation of the same event. The race was sponsored by MCR Group in 2010 and 2011, and Boylesports bookmakers took over the sponsorship from 2012. From 2016 to 2021 the race was sponsored by Ladbrokes Coral bookmakers - the race carried Coral's name from 2016 to 2018, and became the Ladbrokes Hurdle in 2019. It has been run under the present title since 2022.

Records
Most successful horse since 1969 (2 wins):
 Comedy of Errors – 1973, 1974
 Fredcoteri - 1983, 1984
 Redundant Pal- 1986, 1990
 Off You Go -  2018, 2019

Leading jockey since 1969 (4 wins):
 Tom Taaffe –  Fredcoteri (1983, 1984), Bonalma (1986), Roark (1988)

Leading trainer since 1969 (6 wins):
 Arthur Moore -  Irian (1979), Fredcoteri (1983, 1984), Bonalma (1986), Roark (1988), Graphic Equaliser (1998)

Winners
 Weights given in stones and pounds.

Note: Some sources may not regard the current race (2001–present) as a continuation of the Ladbroke Hurdle (1987–2000).

See also
 Horse racing in Ireland
 List of Irish National Hunt races

References

 Racing Post:

 bbc.co.uk – Hurdle highlight at Leopardstown.
  – Ladbroke Hurdle at Ascot, December 22, 2001.
 

National Hunt races in Ireland
National Hunt hurdle races
Leopardstown Racecourse
1969 establishments in Ireland
Recurring sporting events established in 1969